Ukulhas(Dhivehi: އުކުޅަސް), one of the inhabited islands of Alif Alif Atoll, is a uniquely featured, environmentally friendly island in the Maldives.

Ukulhas is well known for its cleanliness, well-maintained waste management system and also known as first systematically waste managed island in the history of Republic of Maldives. Ukulhas conducts several cleaning and planting programs each year and organizes several awareness programs on waste management, marine ecosystems, and biodiversity. As being recognized as an environmental role model island in the Republic of Maldives, Ukulhas achieved a Green Leaf award in 2014 for its outstanding services on protecting and preserving the island's environment.

History

Geography 

It is an oval-shaped, flat coral sand cay, oriented North-West to South-East, 1025 meters long, 225 meters wide, for an area of 17.4 hectares.

Climate
Ukulhas has a tropical climate however warm temperature year around could experience with sunshine. The warm climate has got relatively minor variation in daily temperature throughout a year period. The weather is seemed to large during monsoons. Southwest monsoon lasts from May to November when the northeast monsoon goes from December to April. April is the hottest in average and December is to be recorded as coolest season in average. The month February is notably seen as the driest season while December to April being relatively dries. Maldives is lucky to be remaining as a safe and harmonious country as severe storms are rare made by its location in the equatorial belt.

Demography

Governance

The island has had a series of political changes throughout the last couple of decades. Before the existence and the ratification of present constitution, the island had been entirely centralized by the central government. The island had a chief (Head of the Island) who had to be appointed by the Atoll chief (Head of Atoll). The atoll chief was a person who had to be appointed by the Minister of Atolls and Administration.

After the ratification of the present constitution dated on 7 August 2008, within the democratic movement in the government everything had revolved. The centralized system of the government had changed into a decentralized system. Local governments were formed in the name of local councils. Councilors were elected by the people of the island.

Economy

Tourism 
Tourism in Ukulhas formally started on 15 November 2012. The first guest house in Ukulhas is Ukulhas Inn which was founded by Mr. Ibrahim Shifaz Shaukath, Ever Blue, Aa. Ukulhas and registered on 12 September 2012. The First International tourist who visited Ukulhas formally was a Thai national named Mr. Bandarn Suetrong, who made the booking through agoda.com and travelled Maldives from Thailand. He visited Ukulhas on 15 Nov 2012 and departed on 18 Nov 2012 (stayed in Ukulhas for four days).

Restaurants and cafes 
Ukulhas cafés and restaurants offer diversify cuisines including western, eastern, Indian, Thai, continental and Maldivian ones. As Ukulhas is famous for fishing, fishes have always been the most prominent element of Ukulhas food. Especially sea food dinner makes you the keen interest of Maldivian taste. Like other parts of Maldives, Ukulhas food is spicy even though restaurants are ready to meet up your taste requirements by making it milder. Sweet, sour, hot and spicy foods are common in Ukulhas.

Snacks are found to be in the name of Hedhika. Hedhika is the short eats popular in many restaurants and cafés. Hot and spicy savories are made of smoked fish, grated coconut, lime juice, onion and chili. It includes bajiya (pastry stuffed with fish), Kulhi boakibaa (fishcake), Keemia (fish rolls), gulha (fish balls), and masroshi (small pancake stuffed with fish). Sweet items are made from flour, sugar, and essence. It includes fonibaokibaa (cake made of flour), githeyo boakibaa (made of flour, onions and butter), and huni hakuru folhi (made of grated coconut, sugar and flour). Usual option is served to be a cup of black tea (kalhu sai) within the short eats.
Ukulhas cafés and restaurants are opened each and every day from early morning to 1 am.

Traditional meal consists of rice, garudhiya (fish soup) and side dishes consists of chili, lemon and onion. Instead of garudhiya, fish paste known as rihaakuru and curries are also used. (These meals are served during Eid festivals, christening of child, Maulood festivals etc.)

Today Ukulhas meals have been highly affected by western items like sandwiches, margarine; jam noodles and pasta like items. For common meals, like other Maldivians, Ukulhas community uses many items for their everyday meals. Traditional recipe of breakfast and all the other meals have already been altered. Beside of it Roshi (chapatti), mashuni (made of grated coconut, fish, lemon and onions), curries (made from fish or vegetable or egg), are used as popular dishes for breakfast. For lunch variety of items are prepared. Most of the islanders take rice with various types of curries (e.g.: curries made by fish, vegetable, chicken, dhal, potato, egg etc.), salads, garudhiya (fish soup), fried fishes, fried chickens, barbecued grilled fishes, raw vegetables and many others. Those meals are also served with numerous types of drinks. Coconut and Orange juice are the most popular drinks within the meals in Ukulhas Island.

Variety of appetizers, deserts, cool, soft drinks and coffees are also available at the restaurants. Alcoholic beverages and pork are prohibited by law in the local islands as per Maldives is known to be a 100 percent Muslim country. However those are served in other resorts and Cruises.

Waste management 
Ukulhas is well regarded as an environment friendly Island where the waste is managed in a systematic manner. As a result of its outstanding services to protect and preserve the vulnerable environment, Ukulhas achieved the ‘Green Leaf Award’ by the Maldivian government in the year 2014. Ukulhas implements huge cleaning programs, planting programs, several programs on waste management and programs on marine and biodiversity. Hence today Ukulhas is exemplary island on dealing with mega environmental issues which results Ukulhas is marked as environmentally role model Island in its archipelago.

Today ukulhas islanders do not require going out for dump their garbage; Island council manages island wastes in a systematic manner. For outside trash management, dustbins are kept in an adequate distance everywhere in the island. People in the island may not require throw their litters such as cans, bottle, papers etc. Therefore, the island and its beaches are kept clean and tidy.
In ukulhas, households manage their wastes by segregation, such as recyclable items (e.g.; aluminum, copper, steel, plastics, papers etc.), organic items (e.g.; food items), and plant materials (e.g.; leaves, stems etc.).  After the segregation the wastes are kept in the houses. Except Friday, each day council pick-up visits houses to collect segregated wastes for disposing and managing; Fees are collected by the council for the waste management.

Collected house hold wastes are segregated by the ‘Waste Management Centre’ into organic items, Recyclable items and Plant materials. After the segregation wastes are disposed. Since landfill method is very common in Maldives, Ukulhas is one of the first islands where landfill method is not practiced.

Three major methods are used in ukulhas for the disposal; such as recycling, pyrolysis and Composting. Aluminium items such as beverage cans, copper such as wires, steel and aerosol cans, old steel furnishings or equipment, polyethylene and PET bottles, Glass bottles and jars etc. are separated. Recyclable items are sold once or twice a month. For the pyrolysis, plant items, wooden materials, card boards, magazines, light paper, etc. are placed on a decomposition chamber which is burned into charcoal and ash. For the composting, organic matters are decomposed and recycled as a fertilizer. It is a key ingredient for organic farming. For decompose organic matters such as leaves, ‘green’ food wastes are wetted make a heap and keep those heaps for a week or months to break down into humus. After the breaking down into humus, composed fertilizers are packed and labelled for the sale.

Education

Ukulhas School 
GCE Advance Level Education in Ukulhas Island
‘Ukulhahu School’ established in the island of Ukulhas is recognized and notified as the first ever A-Level institution in the North Ari Atoll in the history of its archipelago. The A Level studies program (A Level campaign) was started and initiated with an immense effort led by the people of Ukulhas Island.

After the inauguration of the A-Level program, Ukulhas community composed an organizing and managing committee for the A-Level program in the name of “A Level Committee”. When the A-level committee emerged from the first day itself they started its functions, trying to cross all the steps towards its establishment and sustainability. With enormous and tremendous efforts led together by the A Level Committee and the citizens of ukulhas the A-Level program has reaped immense success as the first A- level batch of the institution achieved the national top ten awards.[1] For the continuity and sustainability of the ‘Ukulhas A Level program’ from the beginning, the citizens of ukulhas have been filling their commitment volunteering and providing free aid for all the students at all means if it is in relation with their academic progress.

Qualified students from other islands are highly invited to join the program with Ukulhas Community providing everything required for the whole A Level program including travel costs, accommodation, clothing, uniform, pocket money, books, stationeries etc. Ukulhas community spends more than 1.5 million rufiyaa each year for the program. It’s a huge and a fantastic opportunity to join the ‘Ukulhas School’ to pursue A-Level studies in a gentle and a friendly environment.

Healthcare 

Based on historical findings, there were no provisions of formal health services in Ukulhas before 1982. Before 1982 people in Ukulhas used to obtain health services from traditional medical practitioners. Traditional medical practitioners used to treat patients by using herbal medicine, which referred to as plant’s seeds, berries, roots, leaves, bark, flowers etc .

Formal health services were first established in Ukulhas at the island’s administrative office on 7 June 1982 by establishing an independent section with a local Family Health worker. The family Health worker was a person who only qualified for the provision of limited, basic health services, such as local consultations, counseling, distribution of birth control drugs, dressing a wound, distribution of other symptomatic medicines etc. It was Family Health worker’s duty to visit local residences in a periodic manner to monitor the health standards of Islanders and to maintain records which have to be sent to the Concern central government Authorities.

After several years of limited health services provided by a local Family Health worker, people of Ukulhas found an independent Health institution in the name of Health Post on 14 August 2004, with more facilities and equipment available than the ‘Family Health Section’. Health post provided two trained traditional birth attendants with Family Health workers.

On 1 June 2007, the day started with a new chapter by establishing a Health Center after many years of limited Health services with a professional Medical Officer (Medical Doctor), Staff Nurses and Administrative staffs. Health Center is equipped with modern sophisticated equipment including, ECG machine, Nebulization facilities, IV injections etc. The Centre also designed with consultation rooms, admission wards, and other required facilities. 
The Health Centre started its operation with a Pharmacy and an ambulance which operates for urgent and exceptional matters.

Health Centre is operating with a qualified doctor who is assisted by nurses and is always on standby for urgent matters after his scheduled duty every day. The Centre is open for its services for Accidents and emergency care for 24 hours a day.

Sport and leisure

Gymnasium and fitness training 
'Body Work' in Ukulhas is the first ever established body building and fitness training institution in North Ari Atoll. Sophisticated equipment available such as, bench press machine, chest fly machine, shoulder press machine, let pull down machine, biceps curl machine, leg extension machine etc. The gym is organized and run by the oldest Association in the island known as Glorious Sports Club (GSC).

Kudakudhinge Ufa (Children's park)
This magnificent park, Kudakudhinge Ufa stands proudly as a testament to the community's commitment to the well-being of the children. Children enjoy playgrounds and entertaining feature such as plastic toys, outdoor fitness equipment, leisure chairs, bungee trampoline and other suitable equipment. The park is designed for all ages of children, with adult supervision.

The entire park is surrounded by security fencing with gates at main entry. Part of the playing area is a grassy lawn area with benches and shaded structures. Benches are placed as outdoor seating which have been provided by the landscape and slip resistant paving goes along with the theme of the design which starts from the entry.

In front the main entrance, a beautiful fish pond is seen with various pond fishes such as cat fish, Algae eater, Fathead minnow, Gold Fish, Koi carp, Sturgeon etc.
Precisely this park should be an example of why 'Ukulhas' is such a great place to work and live.

Culture 
Boduberu is one of the most popular forms of traditional music and dance founds in Ukulhas even in the Maldives too. Boduberu is performed by about 15 people, including four drummers with background and a lead singer. Bodu beru is played with a set of drums and an Onugan’du. 

Onudgadu is a small piece of bamboo which lays horizontal grooves, from which raspy sounds are produced by scraping.  The songs may be of heroism, romance or satire. The prelude to the song is a slow with emphasis on drumming, and dancing. As the song reaches a crescendo, one or two dancers maintain the wild beat with their frantic movements ending in some cases in a terrace. The costume of the performers is a sarong and white sleeved shirt.

Religion

Kudamiski'y 
 The oldest mosque in Ukulhas. The oldest structure in the Ukulhas is 'Maamiskiy' or Kuda Miskiy (Old Friday Mosque), which is also known as oldest monument, built in 1656, during the reign of Sultan Ibrahim Iskandar.  The coral-stone structures walls are intricately carved with patterns.

References

External links 
 

Islands of the Maldives